Cris Peter (June 15, 1983) is a Brazilian colorist. She works mainly in the American comics market for publishers like DC Comics and Marvel Comics. She was nominated for the Eisner Award for her colors in comic series Casanova. She also did the colors of important Brazilian comics, as Astronauta – Magnetar (with Danilo Beyruth, published by Panini Comics) and Petals (with Gustavo Borges, published by Marsupial Editora). In 2013, she published the theoretical book O Uso das Cores (The Use of Colors), by Marsupial Editora. She won the Troféu HQ Mix in 2016 and 2017, in the category "Best Colorist".

References 

Brazilian female comics artists
1983 births
Living people
Comics colorists
Prêmio Angelo Agostini winners